The Women's Air Derby was the first official women-only air race in the United States, taking place during the 1929 National Air Races.  Humorist Will Rogers referred to it as the Powder Puff Derby, the name by which the race is most commonly known. Nineteen pilots took off from Santa Monica, California on August 18, 1929 (another left the next day). Marvel Crosson died in a crash apparently caused by carbon monoxide poisoning, but fifteen completed the race in Cleveland, Ohio, nine days later.

The race

Background 
During the first two decades of heavier-than-air flying, the few women fliers in the United States became acquainted with one another during air meets and air rodeos. The bonds among the top women pilots were strengthened in the first real race for female pilots—the Women's Air Derby during the 1929 National Air Races and Aeronautical Exposition. Air-race promoter Cliff Henderson was the founder of the first Women's Air Derby, which he patterned after the men's transcontinental air races. (Ironically, Henderson would ban women from competing in the 1934 Bendix Trophy and National Air Races after a crash which claimed the life of pilot Florence Klingensmith in 1933.)

To qualify, pilots had to have at least 100 hours of solo flight, which included a minimum 25 hours of cross-country flying (these were the same rules that applied to men competing in the National Air Races). The twenty competitors, eighteen of whom were from the United States, were:

Florence "Pancho" Lowe Barnes
Marvel Crosson
Amelia Earhart
Ruth Elder
Claire Mae Fahy
Edith Foltz
Mary Haizlip
Jessie Miller, an Australian
Opal Kunz
Mary von Mach
Ruth Nichols
Blanche W. Noyes
Gladys O'Donnell
Phoebe Omlie
Neva Paris
Margaret Perry
Thea Rasche, a German
Louise Thaden
Evelyn "Bobbi" Trout
Vera Dawn Walker

One of the qualifications was that the aircraft would have to have horsepower "appropriate for a woman." Opal Kunz's 300-horsepower Travel Air was deemed to be "too fast for a woman to fly" (even though she owned and flew it), so she had to find a less powerful aircraft to race.

Route 
The pilots, fourteen in the heavy plane class (with engines from 510 to 875 cubic in.) and six in the lighter class (275-510 cubic in.), took off from Santa Monica, California. Stops en route to Cleveland included San Bernardino, California; Yuma, Arizona; Phoenix, Arizona; Douglas, Arizona; El Paso, Texas; Pecos, Texas; Midland, Texas; Abilene, Texas; Fort Worth, Texas; St. Louis, Missouri; and Cincinnati, Ohio.  At each stop, the pilots often overnighted for refueling, repairs, media attention and dinner banquets.

Airborne 
To keep all competing aircraft safely separated as they climbed to altitude, they were lined up in rows at the start of the race and took off at one-minute intervals, the lighter aircraft first. National Aeronautic Association official Joe Nikrent was the official timekeeper. Earhart had an electrical problem and had to return to the airfield, but repairs were made quickly, and she resumed flying.

Marvel Crosson crashed in the Gila River Valley and was killed, apparently the victim of carbon monoxide poisoning. There was a public outcry demanding the race be canceled, but the pilots got together and decided the most fitting tribute would be to finish the derby. Blanche Noyes had to put out a fire that erupted in mid-air over Pecos, but continued on. (In the 2010 documentary Breaking Through the Clouds: The First Women's National Air Derby, Noyes, a non-smoker, explained that she found a cigarette butt in her baggage compartment.) Margaret Perry caught typhoid fever. Pancho Barnes crashed into a car that drove onto the runway as she was trying to land, wrecking her airplane. Ruth Nichols also crashed. Claire Fahy's wing wires were eaten through, possibly sabotaged with acid; she withdrew from the race.
 
An estimated 18,000 people gathered in Cleveland, Ohio, to greet the pilots at the end of the race. Louise Thaden finished the race first on August 26 and won the heavy class in a time of 20 hours, 19 minutes and 4 seconds. Phoebe Omlie won the light class in 25 hours, 12 minutes and 47.5 seconds.

Standings
Heavy class:
Louise Thaden
Gladys O'Donnell
Amelia Earhart
Blanche Noyes
Ruth Elder
Neva Paris
Mary Haizlip
Opal Kunz
Mary von Mach
Vera Dawn Walker

Four women completed the race in the light class (order unclear, other than Omlie finishing first):
Phoebe Omlie
Edith Foltz
Jessie Keith-Miller
Thea Rasche

Bobbi Trout finished the race, but was untimed.

Depictions
The race was the subject of the 1935 novel Women in the Wind: A Novel of the Women's National Air Derby by Francis Walton and the 1939 film adaptation, starring Kay Francis.

The book The Powder Puff Derby of 1929: The First All Women's Transcontinental Air Race, written by Gene Nora Jessen, was published in 2002.

The 2010 documentary Breaking through the Clouds: The First Women's National Air Derby covers the race from inception through conclusion, includes interviews with some surviving relatives of pilots, and offers short biographies of some of the women.

References

Bibliography

 ASIN: B0084PL9E4

External links
Photographs of the derby and participants in the Saint Louis University Digital Collections

August 1929 sports events
Air races
American women aviators